Alex Miller (born June 5, 2003) is a country singer and songwriter who appeared on American Idol, Season 19. After he was eliminated, Miller received an invitation from Luke Bryan to perform with Bryan at the Grand Ole Opry. Luke Bryan sang with Miller on the show.

Miller's debut single “I’m Over You, So Get Over Me” was released April 1, 2021. Miller signed a recording deal with Billy Jam Records in September 2021 and released his first single with the label, “Don’t Let The Barn Door Hit Ya” in October 2021. He released "Through with you" in 2022.

Other songs by Miller include;

 When God Made the South. Single • 2022.
 Breaking the Bank. Single • 2022

 That's What Christmas is For. Single • 2022

References

Living people
2003 births
American country singers